Omega Force is a Japanese video game developer and division of Koei Tecmo.

Omega Force may also refer to:

 Omega 7, a Cuban anti-communist paramilitary group based in the United States
 Omega Effect, the power source of Darkseid's Omega Beams